The Bombardier Flexity Swift is a series of urban and inter-urban tram, light rail and light metro vehicles manufactured by Bombardier Transportation. It is part of the Bombardier Flexity family of rail vehicles, and like the others, Flexity Swift vehicles can be customized to suit the needs and requirements of customers including legacy designs from its acquisition of Adtranz.

Railly News reported that, by the end of 2015, more than 1,000 Flexity Swift vehicles had been sold.

Overview 
Vehicles in the Flexity Swift family vary in length, but are all articulated, usually with three sections. In most cases, the centre section is very short, but can be replaced with a longer section in order to increase capacity, as London is considering doing for future lines. The trams can also be coupled together into trains. Nevertheless, they are all bi-directional with cabs at both ends and doors on both sides. An emphasis is placed on speed with units capable of safely reaching speeds of  when running on dedicated lines.

The Flexity Swift family comes in two distinct versions with a 70% low-floor version to allow access to those in wheelchairs without requiring the construction of high platforms in city streets and a high-floor version with level boarding at raised platforms, generally to retain compatibility with stations built for older trams or trains. While they typically use DC overhead lines for power collection, the Rotterdam vehicles are also equipped with third rail power capability for use on the central sections of the network, while the Karlsruhe tram-trains are compatible with AC electrification which is used on the mainline railways.

Both the low and high-floor models were originally developed for use on the Cologne Stadtbahn in Germany. Other uses of Flexity Swift vehicles include London Tramlink, Manchester Metrolink, the tram networks in Istanbul and Melbourne, Rotterdam Metro, Karlsruhe Stadtbahn, Bonn Stadtbahn, Stockholm light rail lines 12 and 22, and the Metro Light Rail in Minneapolis-Saint Paul, Minnesota. The scrapped Merseytram plan for Liverpool in Merseyside planned to use the same model as London.

The Flexity Swift's closest competitors are the Alstom Citadis family (particularly the RegioCitadis, Citadis Dualis, and Citadis Spirit variants), Siemens's S70/Avanto, SD100/SD160, SD400/SD460 and S200, and Sirio from AnsaldoBreda. Compared to Bombardier's other Flexity vehicles, these vehicles are not designed for streetcar operation with extensive mixed-traffic operations, although they do operate as such on a number of systems such as in London, Manchester, and Melbourne.

Technical specifications

Low-floor versions

High-floor versions

See also 
 Bombardier Flexity Freedom

References

External links
Flexity official site
About London's trams (unofficial)

Tram vehicles of Germany
Tram vehicles of the Netherlands
Tram vehicles of Sweden
Tram vehicles of Turkey
Tram vehicles of the United Kingdom
Streetcars of the United States
Bombardier Transportation tram vehicles
Manchester Metrolink
Articulated passenger trains
Train-related introductions in 1995